The Trade Unions Central Stadium is a multi-use stadium in Murmansk, Russia. It is currently used mostly for football matches.  The stadium holds 13,400 people.  The stadium was built in 1960.

Redevelopment plans
In 2022, plans for a PPP redevelopment of the stadium were presented.

References 

Football venues in Russia
Sport in Murmansk
Buildings and structures in Murmansk Oblast
Sports venues built in the Soviet Union
1960 establishments in the Soviet Union